Solnechny is a closed urban locality (an urban-type settlement) in Tver Oblast, Russia, located on Gorodomlya Island on Lake Seliger. Population:

Administrative and municipal status
Within the framework of administrative divisions, it is incorporated as Solnechny Okrug—an administrative unit with the status equal to that of the districts. As a municipal division, Solnechny Okrug is incorporated as Solnechny Urban Okrug.

References

Notes

Sources

Urban-type settlements in Tver Oblast
Closed cities
